Xevi Vilaró (born 12 January 1975 in La Cellera de Ter, Girona, Catalonia), is a Spanish painter.

Vilaró captured the public's attention in the year 2000, after winning the First Prize of the Gallerie Artitude in Paris, France.

A selection of his works is part of the permanent collection of the prestigious Vila Casas Foundation.

External links
Biographies and news
Xevi Vilaró's profile at the Ginocchio Galeria website
Interview, SiEs.TV, Spain

Sources

1975 births
20th-century Spanish painters
20th-century Spanish male artists
Spanish male painters
21st-century Spanish painters
Living people
21st-century Spanish male artists